There are four storms named Esther worldwide.

In the Atlantic:
 Tropical Storm Esther (1957)
 Hurricane Esther (1961)

In the Australian basin:
 Tropical Cyclone Esther (1983)
 Tropical Cyclone Esther (2020)

Atlantic hurricane set index articles